Nivea–Fuchs was an Italian professional cycling team that existed from 1954 to 1956. The team was formed when the Ganna team told its leader, Fiorenzo Magni, that it would not be able to continue and he gained the backing of the German cosmetics company Nivea to be the main sponsor of a new team. It was the first non-bicycle industry company team sponsor. Magni won the general classification of the 1955 Giro d'Italia with the team.

References

External links

Cycling teams based in Italy
Defunct cycling teams based in Italy
1954 establishments in Italy
1956 disestablishments in Italy
Cycling teams established in 1954
Cycling teams disestablished in 1956